Amphizoa insolens is a species of aquatic beetles. It is found in North America from Alaska to southern California.

Adult A. insolens beetles are between 10.9 and 15 millimeters long. Their front tarsi lack well-developed grooves with hair-like setae.

References

Adephaga
Beetles described in 1853
Aquatic insects
Taxa named by John Lawrence LeConte